Saint Michel Boulevard may refer to
 Boulevard Saint-Michel, in Paris
 Saint-Michel Boulevard (Montreal)